Romain Haguenauer (born 16 July 1976) is a French ice dancing coach, choreographer, and former competitor. He is best known for his work with the French five-time World and 2022 Olympic champions Gabriella Papadakis and Guillaume Cizeron; and with Canadian three-time World champions and two-time Olympic champions Tessa Virtue and Scott Moir. He has also coached the top-ranking American teams of Madison Hubbell and Zachary Donohue, and Madison Chock and Evan Bates.

Personal life 
Haguenauer was born on 16 July 1976 in Lyon, France. His mother, an elementary school teacher, and father, a lawyer, raised him in Ainay. After graduating in 1998 from Claude Bernard University Lyon 1 with a master's degree in science, sport and physical education (Capes d'éducation physique et sportive), he taught for a year at a secondary school, collège Jean-Monnet.

In 2017, Haguenauer married Jamal Othman, a former Swiss figure skater.

Competitive career 
Haguenauer was coached from the age of five by Muriel Boucher-Zazoui and competed with his sister, Marianne Haguenauer, for ten years. They placed eighth at the 1995 World Junior Championships in November 1994 in Budapest and won gold at the 1995 Ondrej Nepela Memorial. Due to his sister's health issues, he retired from competition at age 20. He had no regrets, as he had a strong interest in coaching.

Results with Marianne Haguenauer 
GP: Champions Series (Grand Prix)

Post-competitive career

Haguenauer worked as a part-time skating coach before becoming a certified coach in 1999. He has also served as a technical executive for the Pôle de Lyon. He has co-authored a children's book about skating, Le p'tit ABC du patinage, with Alexandre Navarro.

Haguenauer was formerly based in Lyon, France, working as a coach and choreographer in collaboration with Zazoui. In July 2014, he moved to Montreal, Quebec, Canada and began coaching alongside Marie-France Dubreuil and Patrice Lauzon, at the Gadbois Centre.

His current students include (with medals won while coached by Haguenauer):

 Gabriella Papadakis / Guillaume Cizeron (gold medalists in 2022 Olympics, silver medalists in 2018 Olympics, five World (since they won in 2022) and five European titles)
 Laurence Fournier Beaudry / Nikolaj Sørensen
 Madison Chock / Evan Bates (bronze medallists in 2022 Worlds, 4th place at 2022 Olympics)
 Marie-Jade Lauriault / Romain Le Gac
 Marjorie Lajoie / Zachary Lagha
 Sasha Fear / George Waddell
 Lilah Fear / Lewis Gibson (British National Champions)
 Kaitlin Hawayek / Jean-Luc Baker
Misato Komatsubara / Tim Koleto
Wang Shiyue / Liu Xinyu
Rikako Fukase / Eichu Cho
Holly Harris / Jason Chan
Chen Hong / Sun Zhuoming
Alicia Fabbri / Paul Ayer
Emmy Bronsard / Aissa Bouaraguia
Allison Reed / Saulius Ambrulevičius
His former students include:
 Carolane Soucisse / Shane Firus
Teodora Markova / Simon Daze 
Ellie Fisher / Simon-Pierre Malette-Paquette 
 Isabelle Delobel / Olivier Schoenfelder
 Nathalie Péchalat / Fabian Bourzat
 Pernelle Carron / Matthieu Jost
 Pernelle Carron / Lloyd Jones
 Marie-France Dubreuil / Patrice Lauzon
 Tiffany Zahorski / Alexis Miart
 Louise Walden / Owen Edwards
 Sara Hurtado / Adrià Díaz
 Alexandra Paul / Mitchell Islam
 Élisabeth Paradis / François-Xavier Ouellette
 Lee Ho-jung / Richard Kang-in Kam 
 Celia Robledo / Luis Fenero
 Rikako Fukase / Aru Tateno
Tessa Virtue / Scott Moir (Gold medal at the 2018 Olympics, Gold medal at the Grand Prix Final in 2017, Gold medal at the Worlds in 2017,  and 2017 Four Continents title)
 Madison Hubbell / Zachary Donohue (bronze medalists in 2022 Olympics, 4th place at 2018 Olympic games, silver medalists at 2018 Worlds, silver medallists in 2022 Worlds)
 Olivia Smart / Adrià Díaz (Spanish National Champions)
 Tina Garabedian / Simon Proulx-Sénécal
Haguenauer has also choreographed programs for singles skaters, among them Alban Préaubert and Sonia Lafuente.

References 

French male ice dancers
French figure skating coaches
Figure skating choreographers
Living people
1976 births
Sportspeople from Lyon
French emigrants to Quebec
LGBT figure skaters
Gay sportsmen